Forth Wanderers Football Club are a Scottish football club based in the village of Forth, South Lanarkshire.

History
Since 1934 they have played at Kingshill Park in the village, however they have had to share with Carluke Rovers for a spell and play on a public park in Carnwath when this ground proved unusable. The team's first games were played at Pleasure Park before the Wanderers moved to Hie Dyke in 1929. It was 5 years later until they moved to what is their current home, Kingshill Park in 1934.

Forth have supplied two Scottish international goalkeepers in George Wood and Rab Douglas. Rangers legend Willie Waddell came from the village and starred for the team in his pre-Ibrox days.

Wanderers reached the semi-finals of the Scottish Junior Cup in 1981 and their home quarter-final tie versus East Kilbride Thistle attracted a record crowd of 2,324.

The team is managed by Thomas Devine.

Honours
 Lanarkshire League winners: 1965–66
 Central League B Division winners: 1979–80
 Lanarkshire Junior Cup: 1959–60
 Lanarkshire Hozier Cup: 1913–14
 Central League Cup: 1984–85
 Scottish Junior Cup semi-finalists 1980–81

References

External links
Website 

Football clubs in Scotland
Scottish Junior Football Association clubs
Association football clubs established in 1904
Football in South Lanarkshire
1904 establishments in Scotland
West of Scotland Football League teams